Tiago André Barata Feio Peixoto Apolónia (born 28 July 1986) is a Portuguese table tennis player for German club TTF LIEBHERR Ochsenhausen and Portugal. As of August 2016, he is ranked the number eighteenth player in the world.

Career
Born in Lisbon, Apolónia began playing table tennis aged six at his hometown club Estrela da Amadora. As a youth player, he was crowned European Junior Doubles champion in 2004 and won a silver medal in the Doubles competition at the Junior World Championships in 2003, both partnering Marcos Freitas.
After playing for German clubs TTC indeland Jülich, 1. FC Saarbrücken and TTF LIEBHERR Ochsenhausen, he arrived at his current club TTC Neu-Ulm in 2019. In 2006, he won his first ITTF Pro Tour Doubles title in São Paulo, partnering João Monteiro. His first ITTF Pro Tour Singles title followed in October 2010 with the Austrian Open in Wels, where he beat Germany's Timo Boll in the final.

He qualified for the 2008 Summer Olympics in Beijing, where he competed in the Men's Singles.

At the 2012 Summer Olympics, he was part of the Portuguese men's team.

In 2015 he won first place with his national team (João Geraldo and Marcos Freitas) in table tennis at the 2015 European Games in Baku.

References

External links

1986 births
Living people
Sportspeople from Lisbon
Portuguese male table tennis players
Table tennis players at the 2008 Summer Olympics
Table tennis players at the 2012 Summer Olympics
Table tennis players at the 2016 Summer Olympics
Olympic table tennis players of Portugal
European Games gold medalists for Portugal
European Games medalists in table tennis
Table tennis players at the 2015 European Games
S.L. Benfica (table tennis)
World Table Tennis Championships medalists
Table tennis players at the 2019 European Games
European Games bronze medalists for Portugal
Table tennis players at the 2020 Summer Olympics
21st-century Portuguese people